The Well-Tempered Clavier, BWV 846–893, consists of two sets of preludes and fugues in all 24 major and minor keys for keyboard by Johann Sebastian Bach. In the composer's time, clavier, meaning keyboard, referred to a variety of instruments, most typically the harpsichord or clavichord, but not excluding the organ.

Bach gave the title  to a book of preludes and fugues in all 24 keys, major and minor, dated 1722, composed "for the profit and use of musical youth desirous of learning, and especially for the pastime of those already skilled in this study". Some 20 years later, Bach compiled a second book of the same kind (24 pairs of preludes and fugues), which became known as The Well-Tempered Clavier, Part Two (in German: Zweyter Theil, modern spelling: Zweiter Teil).

Modern editions usually refer to both parts as The Well-Tempered Clavier, Book I (WTC I) and The Well-Tempered Clavier, Book II (WTC II), respectively. The collection is generally regarded as one of the most important works in the history of classical music.

Composition history

Each set contains twenty-four pairs of prelude and fugue. The first pair is in C major, the second in C minor, the third in C major, the fourth in C minor, and so on. The rising chromatic pattern continues until every key has been represented, finishing with a B minor fugue. The first set was compiled in 1722 during Bach's appointment in Köthen, the second followed 20 years later in 1742 while he was in Leipzig.

Bach recycled some of the preludes and fugues from earlier sources: the 1720 Klavierbüchlein für Wilhelm Friedemann Bach, for instance, contains versions of eleven of the preludes of the first book of the Well-Tempered Clavier. The C major prelude and fugue in book one was originally in C major – Bach added a key signature of seven sharps and adjusted some accidentals to convert it to the required key.

In Bach's own time just one similar collection was published, by Johann Christian Schickhardt (1681–1762), whose Op. 30 L'alphabet de la musique, contained 24 sonatas in all keys for flute or violin and basso continuo, and included a transposition scheme for alto recorder.

Precursors

Although the Well-Tempered Clavier was the first collection of fully worked keyboard pieces in all 24 keys, similar ideas had occurred earlier. Before the advent of modern tonality in the late 17th century, numerous composers produced collections of pieces in all seven modes: Johann Pachelbel's magnificat fugues (composed 1695–1706), Georg Muffat's Apparatus Musico-organisticus of 1690 and Johann Speth's Ars magna of 1693 for example. Furthermore, some two hundred years before Bach's time, equal temperament was realized on plucked string instruments, such as the lute and the theorbo, resulting in several collections of pieces in all keys (although the music was not yet tonal in the modern sense of the word):
 24 groups of dances, "clearly related to 12 major and 12 minor keys" (1584) by Vincenzo Galilei (c.1528–1591)
 30 preludes for 12-course lute or theorbo by John Wilson (1595–1674)
His contemporary Johann Heinrich Kittel (1652–1682) also composed a cycle of 12 organ preludes in successive keys.

J.C.F. Fischer's Ariadne musica neo-organoedum (published in 1702 and reissued 1715) is a set of 20 prelude-fugue pairs in ten major and nine minor keys and the Phrygian mode, plus five chorale-based ricercars. Bach knew the collection and borrowed some of the themes from Fischer for the Well-Tempered Clavier. Other contemporary works include the treatise Exemplarische Organisten-Probe (1719) by Johann Mattheson (1681–1764), which included 48 figured bass exercises in all keys, Partien auf das Clavier (1718) by Christoph Graupner (1683–1760) with eight suites in successive keys, and Friedrich Suppig's Fantasia from Labyrinthus Musicus (1722), a long and formulaic sectional composition ranging through all 24 keys which was intended for an enharmonic keyboard with 31 notes per octave and pure major thirds. Finally, a lost collection by Johann Pachelbel (1653–1706), Fugen und Praeambuln über die gewöhnlichsten Tonos figuratos (announced 1704), may have included prelude-fugue pairs in all keys or modes.

It was long believed that Bach had taken the title The Well-Tempered Clavier from a similarly named set of 24 Preludes and Fugues in all the keys, for which a manuscript dated 1689 was found in the library of the Brussels Conservatoire. It was later shown that this was the work of a composer who was not even born in 1689: Bernhard Christian Weber (1 December 17125 February 1758). It was in fact written in 1745–50, and in imitation of Bach's example.

Well-Tempered tuning

Bach's title suggests that he had written for a (12-note) well-tempered tuning system in which all keys sounded in tune (also known as "circular temperament"). One of the opposing systems in Bach's day was meantone temperament in which keys with many accidentals sound out of tune. (See also musical tuning.) Bach would have been familiar with different tuning systems, and in particular as an organist would have played instruments tuned to a meantone system.

It is sometimes assumed that by "well-tempered" Bach intended equal temperament, the standard modern keyboard tuning which became popular after Bach's death, but modern scholars suggest instead a form of well temperament. There is debate whether Bach meant a range of similar temperaments, perhaps even altered slightly in practice from piece to piece, or a single specific "well-tempered" solution for all purposes.

Intended tuning
During much of the 20th century it was assumed that Bach wanted equal temperament, which had been described by theorists and musicians for at least a century before Bach's birth. Internal evidence for this may be seen in the fact that in Book 1 Bach paired the E minor prelude (6 flats) with its enharmonic key of D minor (6 sharps) for the fugue. This represents an equation of the most tonally remote enharmonic keys where the flat and sharp arms of the circle of fifths cross each other opposite to C major. Any performance of this pair would have required both of these enharmonic keys to sound identically tuned, thus implying equal temperament in the one pair, as the entire work implies as a whole. However, research has continued into various unequal systems contemporary with Bach's career. Accounts of Bach's own tuning practice are few and inexact. The three most cited sources are Forkel, Bach's first biographer; Friedrich Wilhelm Marpurg, who received information from Bach's sons and pupils; and Johann Kirnberger, one of those pupils.

Forkel reports that Bach tuned his own harpsichords and clavichords and found other people's tunings unsatisfactory; his own allowed him to play in all keys and to modulate into distant keys almost without the listeners noticing it. Marpurg and Kirnberger, in the course of a heated debate, appear to agree that Bach required all the major thirds to be sharper than pure—which is in any case virtually a prerequisite for any temperament to be good in all keys.

Johann Georg Neidhardt, writing in 1724 and 1732, described a range of unequal and near-equal temperaments (as well as equal temperament itself), which can be successfully used to perform some of Bach's music, and were later praised by some of Bach's pupils and associates. J.S. Bach's son Carl Philipp Emanuel Bach himself published a rather vague tuning method which was close to but still not equal temperament: having only "most of" the fifths tempered, without saying which ones nor by how much.

Since 1950 there have been many other proposals and many performances of the work in different and unequal tunings, some derived from historical sources, some by modern authors. Whatever their provenances, these schemes all promote the existence of subtly different musical characters in different keys, due to the sizes of their intervals. However, they disagree as to which key receives which character:
 Herbert Anton Kellner argued from the mid-1970s until his death that esoteric considerations such as the pattern of Bach's signet ring, numerology, and more could be used to determine the correct temperament. His result is somewhat similar to Werckmeister's most familiar "correct" temperament. Kellner's temperament, with seven pure fifths and five  comma fifths, has been widely adopted worldwide for the tuning of organs. It is especially effective as a moderate solution to play 17th-century music, shying away from tonalities that have more than two flats.
 John Barnes analyzed the Well-Tempered Clavier 's major-key preludes statistically, observing that some major thirds are used more often than others. His results were broadly in agreement with Kellner's and Werckmeister's patterns. His own proposed temperament from that study is a  comma variant of both Kellner and Werckmeister, with the same general pattern tempering the naturals, and concluding with a tempered fifth B–F.
 Mark Lindley, a researcher of historical temperaments, has written several surveys of temperament styles in the German Baroque tradition. In his publications he has recommended and devised many patterns close to those of Neidhardt, with subtler gradations of interval size. Since a 1985 article in which he addressed some issues in the Well-Tempered Clavier, Lindley's theories have focused more on Bach's organ music than the harpsichord or clavichord works.

Title page tuning interpretations

More recently there has been a series of proposals of temperaments derived from the handwritten pattern of loops on Bach's 1722 title page. These loops (though truncated by a later clipping of the page) can be seen at the top of the title page image at the beginning of the article.
 Andreas Sparschuh, in the course of studying German Baroque organ tunings, assigned mathematical and acoustic meaning to the loops. Each loop, he argued, represents a fifth in the sequence for tuning the keyboard, starting from A. From this Sparschuh devised a recursive tuning algorithm resembling the Collatz conjecture in mathematics, subtracting one beat per second each time Bach's diagram has a non-empty loop. In 2006 he retracted his 1998 proposal based on A = 420 Hz, and replaced it with another at A = 410 Hz.
 Michael Zapf in 2001 reinterpreted the loops as indicating the rate of beating of different fifths in a given range of the keyboard in terms of seconds-per-beat, with the tuning now starting on C.
 John Charles Francis in 2004 performed a mathematical analysis of the loops using Mathematica under  In 2004, he also distributed several temperaments derived from BWV 924.
Reaction to this work has been both vigorous and mixed, with other writers producing further speculative schemes or variants.
 Daniel Jencka in 2005 proposed a variation of Lehman's layout where one of the  commas is spread over three fifths (G–D–A/B), resulting in a  comma division. Motivations for Jencka's approach involve an analysis of the possible logic behind the figures themselves and his belief that a wide fifth (B–F) found in Lehman's interpretation is unlikely in a well-temperament from the time.
 Graziano Interbartolo and others in 2006 proposed a tuning system deduced from the WTC title page. Their work was also published in a book: Bach 1722 – Il temperamento di Dio – Le scoperte e i significati del 'Wohltemperirte Clavier, p. 136 – Edizioni Bolla, Finale Ligure.

Nevertheless, some musicologists say it is insufficiently proven that Bach's looped drawing signifies anything reliable about a tuning method. Bach may have tuned differently per occasion, or per composition, throughout his career.
David Schulenberg, in his book The Keyboard Music of J. S. Bach, allows that Lehman's argument is "ingenious" but counters that it "lacks documentary support (if the swirls were so important, why did Bach's students not copy them accurately, if at all?") and concludes that the swirls cannot "be unambiguously interpreted as a code for a particular temperament".
Luigi Swich, in his article "Further thoughts on Bach's 1722 temperament", more recently presents an alternative reading from that of Bradley Lehman and others of Johann Sebastian Bach's tuning method as derived from the title-page calligraphic drawing. It differs in significant details, resulting in a circulating but unequal temperament using  Pythagorean-comma fifths that is effective through all 24 keys and, most important, tunable by ear without an electronic tuning device. It is based on the synchronicity between the fifth F–C and the third F–A (c. 3 beats per second) and between the fifth C–G and the third C–E (c. 2 beats per second). Such a system is reminiscent of Herbert Anton Kellner's 1977 temperament and even more, among the others, the temperament of Arp Schnitger's 1688 Organ of St. Ludgeri in Norden and the temperament later described by Carlo Gervasoni in his La scuola della musica (Piacenza, 1800). Such a system with all its major thirds more or less sharp is confirmed by Friedrich Wilhelm Marpurg's report about the way a famous student of Bach's, Johann Philipp Kirnberger, was taught to tune in his lessons with Bach. It allows all 24 keys to be played through without changing tuning nor unpleasant intervals, but with varying degrees of difference-the temperament being unequal, and the keys not all sounding the same. Compared to Werckmeister III, the other 24 keys-circulating temperament, Bach's tuning is much more differentiated with its 8 (instead of Werckmeister's 4) different kinds of major thirds. The manuscript Bach P415 in the Berlin State Library is the only known copy of the WTC to show this drawing which represents, a bit cryptically in Bach's spirit, the purpose for which the masterpiece was written and its solution at the same time. Not surprisingly, since this is most probably the working copy that Johann Sebastian Bach used in his classes.

Content

Each Prelude is followed by a Fugue in the same key. In each book the first Prelude and Fugue is in C major, followed by a Prelude and Fugue in its parallel minor key (C minor). Then all keys, each major key followed by its parallel minor key, are followed through, each time moving up a half tone: C → C → D → E → E → F → F → ... ending with ... → B → B.

Book I
The first book of the Well-Tempered Clavier was composed in the early 1720s, with Bach's autograph dated 1722. Apart from the early versions of several preludes included in W. F. Bach's Klavierbüchlein (1720) there is an almost complete collection of "Prelude and Fughetta" versions predating the 1722 autograph, known from a later copy by an unidentified scribe.

Title page
The title page of the first book of the Well-Tempered Clavier reads:

No. 1: Prelude and Fugue in C major, BWV 846

An early version of the prelude, BWV 846a, is found in Klavierbüchlein für Wilhelm Friedemann Bach (No. 14: "Praeludium 1"). The prelude is a seemingly simple progression of arpeggiated chords, one of the connotations of 'préluder' as the French lutenists used it: to test the tuning. Bach used both G and A into the harmonic meandering.

No. 2: Prelude and Fugue in C minor, BWV 847
Prelude and Fugue in C minor, BWV 847. Prelude also in WFB Klavierbüchlein, No. 15: Praeludium 2.

No. 3: Prelude and Fugue in C major, BWV 848
Prelude and Fugue in C-sharp major, BWV 848. Prelude also in WFB Klavierbüchlein, No. 21: Praeludium [8].

No. 4: Prelude and Fugue in C minor, BWV 849
Prelude and Fugue in C-sharp minor, BWV 849. Prelude also in WFB Klavierbüchlein, No. 22: Praeludium [9].

No. 5: Prelude and Fugue in D major, BWV 850
. Prelude also in WFB Klavierbüchlein, No. 17: Praeludium 4.

No. 6: Prelude and Fugue in D minor, BWV 851
. Prelude also in WFB Klavierbüchlein, No. 16: Praeludium 3.

No. 7: Prelude and Fugue in E major, BWV 852
.

No. 8: Prelude in E minor and Fugue in D minor, BWV 853
. Prelude also in WFB Klavierbüchlein, No. 23: Praeludium [10].  The fugue was transposed from D minor to D minor.

No. 9: Prelude and Fugue in E major, BWV 854
. Prelude also in WFB Klavierbüchlein, No. 19: Praeludium 6.

No. 10: Prelude and Fugue in E minor, BWV 855
Prelude and Fugue in E minor, BWV 855. Early version BWV 855a of the Prelude in Klavierbüchlein für Wilhelm Friedemann Bach (No. 18: "Praeludium 5").

No. 11: Prelude and Fugue in F major, BWV 856
. Prelude also in WFB Klavierbüchlein, No. 20: Praeludium 7.

No. 12: Prelude and Fugue in F minor, BWV 857
. Prelude also in WFB Klavierbüchlein, No. 24: Praeludium [11].

No. 13: Prelude and Fugue in F major, BWV 858
.

No. 14: Prelude and Fugue in F minor, BWV 859
.

No. 15: Prelude and Fugue in G major, BWV 860
.

No. 16: Prelude and Fugue in G minor, BWV 861
Prelude and Fugue in G minor, BWV 861.

No. 17: Prelude and Fugue in A major, BWV 862
.

No. 18: Prelude and Fugue in G minor, BWV 863
.

No. 19: Prelude and Fugue in A major, BWV 864
.

No. 20: Prelude and Fugue in A minor, BWV 865
.

No. 21: Prelude and Fugue in B major, BWV 866
.

No. 22: Prelude and Fugue in B minor, BWV 867
Prelude and Fugue in B-flat minor, BWV 867.

No. 23: Prelude and Fugue in B major, BWV 868
.

No. 24: Prelude and Fugue in B minor, BWV 869
.

Book II
The two major primary sources for this collection of Preludes and Fugues are the "London Original" (LO) manuscript, dated between 1739 and 1742, with scribes including Bach, his wife Anna Magdalena and his oldest son Wilhelm Friedeman, which is the basis for Version A of WTC II, and for Version B, that is the version published by the 19th-century Bach-Gesellschaft, a 1744 copy primarily written by Johann Christoph Altnickol (Bach's son-in-law), with some corrections by Bach, and later also by Altnickol and others.

No. 1: Prelude and Fugue in C major, BWV 870
Prelude and Fugue in C major, BWV 870.

No. 2: Prelude and Fugue in C minor, BWV 871
Prelude and Fugue in C minor, BWV 871.

No. 3: Prelude and Fugue in C major, BWV 872

.

No. 4: Prelude and Fugue in C minor, BWV 873
Prelude and Fugue in C-sharp minor, BWV 873.

No. 5: Prelude and Fugue in D major, BWV 874
.

No. 6: Prelude and Fugue in D minor, BWV 875
Prelude and Fugue in D minor, BWV 875.

No. 7: Prelude and Fugue in E major, BWV 876
.

No. 8: Prelude and Fugue in D minor, BWV 877
.

No. 9: Prelude and Fugue in E major, BWV 878

.

No. 10: Prelude and Fugue in E minor, BWV 879
.

No. 11: Prelude and Fugue in F major, BWV 880
.

No. 12: Prelude and Fugue in F minor, BWV 881
Prelude and Fugue in F minor, BWV 881. Prelude as a theme with variations. Fugue in three voices.

No. 13: Prelude and Fugue in F major, BWV 882
.

No. 14: Prelude and Fugue in F minor, BWV 883
.

No. 15: Prelude and Fugue in G major, BWV 884
.

No. 16: Prelude and Fugue in G minor, BWV 885
.

No. 17: Prelude and Fugue in A major, BWV 886
.

No. 18: Prelude and Fugue in G minor, BWV 887

Prelude and Fugue in G-sharp minor, BWV 887.

No. 19: Prelude and Fugue in A major, BWV 888
.

No. 20: Prelude and Fugue in A minor, BWV 889
.

No. 21: Prelude and Fugue in B major, BWV 890
.

No. 22: Prelude and Fugue in B minor, BWV 891

Prelude and Fugue in B-flat minor, BWV 891.

No. 23: Prelude and Fugue in B major, BWV 892
.

No. 24: Prelude and Fugue in B minor, BWV 893

Prelude and Fugue in B minor, BWV 893.

Style
Musically, the structural regularities of the Well-Tempered Clavier encompass an extraordinarily wide range of styles, more so than most pieces in the literature. The preludes are formally free, although many of them exhibit typical Baroque melodic forms, often coupled to an extended free coda (e.g. Book I preludes in C minor, D major, and B major). The preludes are also notable for their odd or irregular numbers of measures, in terms of both the phrases and the total number of measures in a given prelude.

Each fugue is marked with the number of voices, from two to five. Most are three- and four-voiced fugues, but two are five-voiced (the fugues in C minor and B minor from Book I) and one is two-voiced (the fugue in E minor from Book I). The fugues employ a full range of contrapuntal devices (fugal exposition, thematic inversion, stretto, etc.), but are generally more compact than Bach's fugues for organ.

Several attempts have been made to analyse the motivic connections between each prelude and fugue – most notably Wilhelm Werker and Johann Nepomuk David. The most direct motivic reference appears in the B major set from Book 1, in which the fugue subject uses the first four notes of the prelude, in the same metric position but at half speed.

Reception

Both books of the Well-Tempered Clavier were widely circulated in manuscript, but printed copies were not made until 1801, by three publishers almost simultaneously in Bonn, Leipzig and Zurich. Bach's style went out of favour in the time around his death, and most music in the early Classical period had neither contrapuntal complexity nor a great variety of keys. But, with the maturing of the Classical style in the 1770s, the Well-Tempered Clavier began to influence the course of musical history, with Haydn and Mozart studying the work closely.

Mozart transcribed some of the fugues of the Well-Tempered Clavier for string ensemble:
 BWV 853 → K. 404a/1
 BWV 871 → K. 405/1
 BWV 874 → K. 405/5
 BWV 876 → K. 405/2
 BWV 877 → K. 405/4
 BWV 878 → K. 405/3
 BWV 882 → K. 404a/3
 BWV 883 → K. 404a/2

Fantasy No. 1 with Fugue, K. 394 is one of Mozart's own compositions showing the influence the Well-Tempered Clavier had on him. Beethoven played the entire Well-Tempered Clavier by the time he was eleven, and produced an arrangement of BWV 867, for string quintet.

Hans von Bülow called The Well-Tempered Clavier the "Old Testament" of music (the Beethoven Sonatas were the "New Testament"). In the liner notes to the Clair de Lune compilation of piano encores issued by CBS Masterworks, Philippe Entremont relates an anecdote in which von Bülow, having a distaste for the endless clamor for encores, was facing a thunderously applauding house and raised his hand, saying "Ladies and Gentlemen! If you do not stop this immediately I shall play you Bach's 48 preludes and fugues from beginning to end!" The audience laughed but also stopped applauding as they knew von Bülow was able to perform the work from memory.

Bach's example inspired numerous composers of the 19th century; for instance, in 1835 Chopin started composing his 24 Preludes, Op. 28, inspired by the Well-Tempered Clavier. In the 20th century Dmitri Shostakovich wrote his 24 Preludes and Fugues, an even closer reference to Bach's model. Mario Castelnuovo-Tedesco wrote Les Guitares bien tempérées (The Well-Tempered Guitars), a set of 24 preludes and fugues for two guitars, in all 24 major and minor keys, inspired in both title and structure by Bach's work.

First prelude of Book I

The best-known piece from either book is the first prelude of Book I. Anna Magdalena Bach copied a short version of this prelude in her 1725 Notebook (No. 29). The accessibility of this prelude, the "easy" key of C major, and its use of arpeggiated chords, have made it one of the most commonly studied pieces for piano students. This prelude also served as the basis for the Ave Maria of Charles Gounod.

Tenth prelude of Book I

Alexander Siloti transcribed a piano arrangement of the early version of Prelude and Fugue in E minor (BWV 855a), transposed into a Prelude in B minor.

Recordings
The first complete recording of the Well-Tempered Clavier was made on the piano by Edwin Fischer for EMI between 1933 and 1936. The second was made by Wanda Landowska on harpsichord for RCA Victor in 1949 (Book 1) and 1952 (Book 2). Helmut Walcha, better known as an organist, recorded both books between 1959 and 1961 on a harpsichord. Daniel Chorzempa made the first recording using multiple instruments (harpsichord, clavichord, organ, and fortepiano) for Philips in 1982. As of 2013, over 150 recordings have been documented.

Audio of Book I
Harpsichord performances of various parts of Book I by Martha Goldstein are in the public domain.  Such harpsichord performances may, for instance, be tuned in equal temperament, or in Werckmeister temperament.  In addition to Martha Goldstein, Raymond Smullyan is another well-known artist for whom several performances from Book I are in the public domain.

In March 2015, the pianist Kimiko Douglass-Ishizaka released a new and complete recording of Book 1 into the public domain.  Her performances are available below, beginning with the Prelude No. 1 in C Major (BWV 846):

References

Further reading
 Kirkpatrick, Ralph. Interpreting Bach's Well-Tempered Clavier: A Performer's Discourse of Method (New Haven: Yale University Press, 1987). .
 Ledbetter, David. Bach's Well-Tempered Clavier: The 48 Preludes and Fugues (New Haven: Yale University Press, 2002). .

External links

Interactive media
 (Adobe Flash) Exploring Bach's Well-Tempered Clavier – Korevaar (piano), Goeth (organ), Parmentier (harpsichord). Direct access to the fugues.

Sheet music
 Open-source edition of the Well-Tempered Clavier, Book I available in MuseScore, MusicXML, MIDI, PDF formats, released under CC0
 
 Book 1 (Open Source), Wikimedia Commons
 Johann Sebastian Bach's Werke. Das Wohltemperirte Clavier, Erster Theil / Zweiter Theil (Leipzig 1851): Indiana University School of Music score in GIF format
 Scores of some of the Preludes and Fugues of the Well-Tempered Clavier through the Mutopia Project
 Bach's manuscript of Book II of the Well-Tempered Clavier: Facsimile of British Library Add MS 35021

Recordings
 Free piano recording of Book 1 by Kimiko Ishizaka (Open Well-Tempered Clavier project)
 Complete, free midi recordings of books I & II by John Sankey
 Free midi recording of book II by Prof. Yo Tomita of The Queen's University, Belfast
 Complete, free midi recordings of books I and II by Alan Kennington
 Piano Society – Free audio records of WTC, MP3 files, video
 Free Pipe Organ recording of Books 1 & 2 by Jan Leontsky

On tuning systems
 All existing 18th century quotes on J.S.Bachs temperament
 Larips.com – "Bach" tuning resources – interpreted by Bradley Lehman
 Bach- and Well-Temperaments for Western Classical Music
 Rosetta Revisited – Interpreted by Dominic Eckersley

Descriptions and analyses
 J.S. Bach's Well-Tempered Clavier / In-depth Analysis and Interpretation by Siglind Bruhn. Full text of the 1993 book.
 Animated visualizations of the music by Tim Smith and David Korevaar
 Graphical motif extraction for The Well-Tempered Clavier 1 and The Well-Tempered Clavier 2
 Essay by Yo Tomita about Book I of The Well-Tempered Clavier
 Program notes from the Los Angeles Chamber Orchestra
 Interpretation and analysis of JS Bach's Well-Tempered Clavier by Philip Goeth (includes audio samples)
 
 Well Temperaments, based on the Werckmeister Definition

 
Compositions covering all major and/or minor keys